Massimo De Ambrosis (born 14 July 1964) is an Italian actor and voice actor.

Biography
Born in Rome and the son of actor and voice actor Luciano De Ambrosis, De Ambrosis started his career in 1974. He first became a television actor on the 1990s Italian sitcom Casa dolce casa in which he portrayed Filippo. He is generally known to the Italian public as a voice actor. He is the official voice dubber of Edward Norton, Matthew Perry and Steve Carell. He has also dubbed the voices of Owen Wilson, Josh Lucas, Ben Stiller, Jason Statham and many more.

Among the dubbing roles De Ambrosis is known for is Chandler Bing from Friends as well as Maurice Boscorelli from Third Watch. After the death of his colleague Vittorio De Angelis, De Ambrosis took over his ongoing dubbing contributions. De Ambrosis' animated dubbing roles include Calculon in Futurama and Vegeta in Dragon Ball Z (a role which he shares with Gianluca Iacono).

Personal life
De Ambrosis is married to dubbing assistant Elena Masini and they have two children, Daniele and Luca, who also follow a dubbing career.

Dubbing roles

Animation
Ranger in The Animals of Farthing Wood
Vegeta in Dragon Ball
Calculon and various characters in Futurama
Mayor Shelbourne in Cloudy with a Chance of Meatballs
Kronk Pepikrankenitz in Kronk's New Groove
Spike Spiegel in Cowboy Bebop: The Movie
François in Ratatouille
Terrance in South Park (2000–2003)
Terrance in South Park: Bigger, Longer & Uncut
Fred Jones in Scooby-Doo and the Alien Invaders
Coach Skip in Fantastic Mr. Fox

Live action
Chandler Bing in Friends
Maurice Boscorelli in Third Watch
The Narrator in Fight Club
Evan Baxter in Bruce Almighty
Evan Baxter in Evan Almighty
Adult Mike O'Donnell in 17 Again
Frank Ginsberg in Little Miss Sunshine
Ken Hutch in Starsky & Hutch
Peter Bretter in Forgetting Sarah Marshall
Gary in The Muppets
Ned Plimpton in The Life Aquatic with Steve Zissou
Nicholas "Oz" Oseransky in The Whole Nine Yards
Nicholas "Oz" Oseransky in The Whole Ten Yards
Walter Fane in The Painted Veil
Eisenheim in The Illusionist
Wilbur Wright in Around the World in 80 Days
Marcus Higgins in Grown Ups
Marcus Higgins in Grown Ups 2
Hefty Smurf in The Smurfs
Hefty Smurf in The Smurfs 2''

References

External links

1964 births
Living people
Male actors from Rome
Italian male voice actors
Italian male television actors
Italian voice directors
20th-century Italian male actors
21st-century Italian male actors